The 2022 Football South Australia season was the 116th season of soccer in South Australia, and the tenth under the National Premier Leagues format.

The men's competitions consisted of three major divisions across the State. The season commenced on 18 February, and finished with the NPL Grand final on 9 September, and the State League Grand finals on 10 September.

The women's NPL competition commenced on 25 March, and finished with the Grand Final on 23 September.

Men's Competitions

2022 National Premier Leagues South Australia

The 2022 National Premier Leagues South Australia, known as the RAA National Premier League for sponsorship reasons, was the tenth season of soccer under the competition format in South Australia. It is the first tier of South Australian soccer and the second tier of Australian soccer. Each team plays each other twice, resulting in 22 rounds. The Premier was planned to compete in the 2022 National Premier Leagues finals series, however the competition was not held.

League table

Results

Top Scorers

Finals

2022 State League 1 South Australia

The 2022 State League 1 South Australia was the tenth season of soccer under the competition format in South Australia. It is the second tier of South Australian soccer and the third tier of Australian soccer. Each team plays each other twice, resulting in 22 rounds.

League table

Finals

2022 State League 2 South Australia

The 2022 State League 2 South Australia was the sixth season of soccer under the competition format in South Australia. It is the third tier of South Australian soccer and the fourth tier of Australian soccer. Each team plays each other twice, resulting in 22 rounds.

League table

Finals

Reserves and U18s
All teams from the National Premier League, State League 1 and State League 2 fielded reserves and U18s. These teams acted as curtain raisers for every game throughout the season, playing against the same opposition as the senior team at the same ground.

Women's Competitions

2022 Women's National Premier Leagues South Australia

The 2022 Women's National Premier Leagues South Australia was the seventh season of soccer under the competition format in South Australia. It is the first tier of women's football in South Australia and the second tier of women's football in Australia. Each team plays each other twice, resulting in 18 rounds.

League table

Finals

2022 Women's State League South Australia

The 2022 Women's State League South Australia was the second season of soccer under the competition format in South Australia. It is the second tier of women's football in South Australia and the thid tier of women's football in Australia. Each team plays each other three times, resulting in 14 rounds.

League table

Cup Competitions

2022 Federation Cup

The 2022 Football South Australia Federation Cup was the 109th running of the Federation Cup, the main soccer knockout competition in South Australia. The competition ran alongside the 2022 Australia Cup, with the two finalists qualifying for the competition. Teams from the National Premier Leagues South Australia, State League 1 South Australia, State League 2 South Australia. South Australian Collegiate Soccer League and South Australian Amateur Soccer League participated.

Adelaide City were champions.

Bracket

2022 Federation Cup Final

2022 WNPL and WSL Cup

The 2022 WNPL and WSL Cup was the main women's soccer knockout competition in South Australia for 2022.

West Adelaide were champions.

Bracket

2022 WNPL and WSL Cup Final

Awards 
The end of year awards were presented at Adelaide Convention Centre on 8 October 2022.

National Premier Leagues SA

Notes

References

2022 in Australian soccer
Football South Australia seasons